Asker Skøyteklubb is a Norwegian speed skating club from Asker.

The club was founded on 2 March 1964. Its home track was Føyka until 1992, when Risengabanen was opened.

Well-known speed skaters include Svein-Erik Stiansen, Alf Rekstad, Else Ragni Yttredal, Hege Langli, Unni Marsteinstredet, Tine Køpke, Henrik Christiansen and Ida Njåtun.

References

Speed skating clubs in Norway
Sport in Asker
Sports clubs established in 1964
1964 establishments in Norway